Apostolov is the name of:

 Atanas Apostolov (born 1989), Bulgarian footballer
 Boban Apostolov (born 1984), Macedonian songwriter and record producer
 Ivan Apostolov (1847-1926), Bulgarian haydut and revolutionary
 Mihail Apostolov (1871-1902), Bulgarian officer and member of the Internal Macedonian-Adrianople Revolutionary Organization 
 Risto Apostolov, Macedonian musician, songwriter and record producer
 Rumen Apostolov (born 1963), Bulgarian footballer
 Vidin Apostolov (born 1941), Bulgarian footballer
 Viktor Apostolov (1962–2011), Bulgarian hammer thrower
 Yordan Apostolov (born 1989), Bulgarian footballer

Bulgarian-language surnames
Patronymic surnames